Michael Anthony Galloway (born 13 October 1974) is an English former footballer who played as a midfielder. He was appointed caretaker manager for Hucknall Town's final game of the 2007-08 season, before being appointed as the club's permanent manager along with Andy Miller. In October 2008, they were dismissed. He then quickly joined Worksop Town as a player, he scored an excellent free kick on his debut away at Witton Albion which delighted the travelling support.

In November 2010 he resigned his post as manager of Gedling Town.

References

External links

Unofficial Mick Galloway Profile at The Forgotten Imp

1974 births
Footballers from Nottingham
Living people
English footballers
Association football midfielders
Notts County F.C. players
Gillingham F.C. players
Lincoln City F.C. players
Chesterfield F.C. players
Carlisle United F.C. players
Gretna F.C. players
Hereford United F.C. players
Stirling Albion F.C. players
Workington A.F.C. players
Eastwood Town F.C. players
Penrith F.C. players
Cowdenbeath F.C. players
Hucknall Town F.C. players
Worksop Town F.C. players
English Football League players
National League (English football) players
Scottish Football League players
English football managers
Hucknall Town F.C. managers
Gedling Town F.C. managers
Long Eaton United F.C. managers